The 1959 British West Indies Championships was the third edition of the track and field competition between British colony nations in the Caribbean. It was held in Georgetown in British Guiana. A total of 27 events were contested, twenty-one by men and six by women. This was the first time that women had been able to compete at the event. Three new men's events were added to the programme: 3000 metres steeplechase, half marathon, and the 3000 metres walk. The latter two were the first road running and racewalking events to be included.

For a third time running, George de Peana of British Guiana won both the 5000 metres and 10,000 metres titles, remaining undefeated at the tournament. Aside from de Peana, Ralph Gomes was the only other athlete to defend his title from the 1958 edition, doing so in the 1500 metres. George Kerr rose to prominence with a 400 metres and 800 metres double – distances he would win Olympic medals in a year later. In the women's section, the British Guiana team were dominant, being led by double individual sprint medallist Myrna Fawcett.

Also among the gold medallists was Antigua's Lester Bird, winner of the long jump here, who would later go on to be the Prime Minister of Antigua and Barbuda (succeeding his father, Vere Bird). Triple jump medallist Wendell Mottley also became involved in politics later in his life, serving as Trinidad and Tobago's Finance Minister, and high jumper Anton Norris was another athlete in the field to become a prominent economist in the region.

Medal summary

Men

Women

References

Medallists
British West Indies Championships. GBR Athletics. Retrieved on 2015-03-21.

British West Indies Championships
British West Indies Championships
British West Indies Championships
British West Indies Championships
Athletics in Guyana
Georgetown, Guyana